Loikaw Airport  is an airport in Loikaw, Myanmar.

Airlines and destinations

References

Airports in Myanmar